John I (1267 – 31 January 1330) was the count of Namur from 1305 to 1330. He was a member of the House of Dampierre, the son of Guy of Dampierre, Count of Flanders and Marquis of Namur, and his second wife Isabelle of Luxembourg. John was the father of Blanche of Namur, Queen of Sweden and Norway. He was the elder brother of Guy of Namur, whom he sent to command the Flemish rebels against the French Kingdom in the 1302 Battle of the Golden Spurs.

Life 
In September 1290, he was betrothed to Blanche of France, daughter of Philip III.

Instead, John married Margaret of Clermont, daughter of Robert, Count of Clermont and Beatrix, Dame de Bourbon, in 1307. He was Margaret's second husband. She died after two years of marriage, in 1309.

John's second wife was Marie of Artois (1291 – 22 January 1365, Wijnendaele), (later to become Lady of Merode), daughter of Philip of Artois and Blanche of Brittany. They were married by contract in Paris on 6 March 1310, confirmed Poissy, January 1313. John granted her as dower the castle of Wijnendale in Flanders, ratified by the Count of Flanders (his half-brother, Robert III) in 1313.

Issue

Sources
Medieval Lands Project – Namur

1267 births
1330 deaths
Margraves of Namur
House of Dampierre